Kymnissa was a town of ancient Caria, near Termera. The name does not occur in ancient authors but is derived from epigraphic evidence. 
 
Its site is located near Akçe Köy, Asiatic Turkey.

References

Populated places in ancient Caria
Former populated places in Turkey